Dana Fischer is an American Magic: The Gathering player. She is tied for the youngest to make the second day of a Grand Prix tournament (at age eight) and is the youngest to win cash at a Grand Prix (at age nine).

Background and family life 
Dana Fischer was born in July 2010, and lives with her mother, father, and older sister in Carmel Valley, San Diego. Her father started teaching both daughters Magic when they were very young, before they could read the card text. They learned to play by memorizing the cards. This was similar to how players learn to play with cards in a foreign language. After they learned to read, the process went faster. Her sister lost interest in Magic over the next few years, while Dana continued to play.

Other activities Dana likes include soccer, singing, hula hooping, and gymnastics; her sister teaches her dance moves and life skills like tying her shoes.

Competitive Magic events 
Dana Fischer's first Magic event outside her home was a Two-Headed Giant side event with her father at Grand Prix San Diego in August 2015, aged five; she still could not read all the cards, so Adam guided their play.

She competed in her first Grand Prix on her own in Portland, Oregon, in August 2016, and attended three other Grand Prix events over the next year. She set herself a goal to win five out of nine matches, which she achieved in Las Vegas in June 2017, at the age of six. To do this she needed to play 20-plus games over a 12-hour period with only minor breaks, and do better than 55 percent of the over 3,000 mostly adult players competing. She had to miss the last two days of school to attend the Vegas tournament, but neither she nor her parents objected. Magic is very educational, the Fischers said, helping her with math, reading, strategic, and social skills ahead of her school grade, though Fischer said she regretted staying up until 2:30 am afterwards.

Fischer's next goal was to become the youngest player to make the second day of a Grand Prix tournament, which would have required six match wins.

In 2017 Fischer became known in the competitive Magic community. Some of her matches would be "featured", when her game play would be recorded on video and streamed live and/or played after the tournament, and she would be often invited to the color commentator booth to discuss the matches live. She got a sponsorship from ChannelFireball, a popular Magic retailer, and tournament organizer, and a documentary video made about her by 60 Second Docs. In 2018, Wizards of the Coast, the makers of Magic: The Gathering, made a longer video about her.

In February 2018, Fischer went to her first tournament outside the United States, in Lyon, France. Originally competing in another country would have been a celebration for making day 2 at a United States Grand Prix, but it became a family trip instead. She says she was not bothered by non-English language cards, since she could recognize them by picture, the way she learned to play before learning to read.

In March 2019, aged eight, Fischer achieved her goal of becoming the youngest player to reach Day 2 at a Grand Prix, in Los Angeles. She won six of eight matches, and advanced to the second day among the top 15-20% of about 1,570 mostly adult players. She said her next tournament goals would be to win a number of matches equal to her age, and to bring home a cash prize.

Fischer achieved both of these goals at the Grand Prix Austin in January 2020. She finished in 46th place out of 801 players, with a 10-4-1 win-loss-draw record, and earned $300. Fischer was nine years old, making her the youngest to win cash at a Magic Grand Prix. She was at 13th place at the end of the first day with an 8–1 record. After the match, she tweeted "now have more GP Day 2s than my dad." In her tournament report for ChannelFireball, she wrote that she was especially glad to win cash because she could buy something to share with her sister, who does not play much Magic, making her win something that could benefit the rest of the family as well.

Her continuing goal is to get more kids and women to play Magic, to show that, as she says, "young people can do amazing and hard things".

Play style 

Fischer plays her competitive matches with her father sitting beside her, but not offering her any advice or help, other than helping hold her hand of cards and shuffle her deck (40–100 cards depending on format), because her hands are too small to do it herself. He takes notes on the match, and advises her on what she did well and could have done better.

Since the 2017 San Diego Comic-Con, she has attended matches in cosplay as the Elf planeswalker Nissa Revane – though she replaced the original costume's black wig and pointed ears with a ChannelFireball baseball cap that she places pins on and wears backwards or sideways. "

Writing 
Fischer has written several articles about her game for ChannelFireball's Magic: The Gathering strategy website. Her father helped edit.

Notes

References

External links 

 
 

2010 births
Living people
American Magic: The Gathering players
American sportswomen
Sportspeople from San Diego
21st-century American women